Chuck Anderson may refer to:

 Chuck Anderson (jazz guitarist) (born 1947), American jazz guitarist
 Chuck Anderson (Canadian football) (1917–1975), Canadian Football League player

See also 
 Charles Anderson (disambiguation)